Goodenia dyeri  is a species of flowering plant in the family Goodeniaceae and is endemic to the south-west of Western Australia. It is an ascending herb with egg-shaped, toothed leaves at the base of the plant, with solitary yellow flowers in the leaf axils.

Description
Flowering occurs from August to November and the fruit is a more or less spherical capsule  in diameter.

Taxonomy and naming
Goodenia dyeri was first formally described in 1912 by Kurt Krause in Adolf Engler's journal Das Pflanzenreich from material collected near the railway between Cunderdin and Dedari in 1903. The specific epithet (dyeri) honours William Turner Thiselton-Dyer, director of the Royal Botanic Gardens, Kew 1885–1905.

Distribution and habitat
This goodenia grows on undulating plains between Cowcowing and  Kalgoorlie in the south-west of Western Australia.

Conservation status
Goodenia dyeri is classified as "not threatened" by the Government of Western Australia Department of Parks and Wildlife.

References

dyeri
Eudicots of Western Australia
Plants described in 1912
Endemic flora of Western Australia